Spruill is a surname.  Notable people with the surname Spruill include:

Benjamin Spruill (fl. 1779), American politician
Godfrey Spruill (c. 1650–c. 1719), Scottish-American doctor
Hezekiah Spruill (1732–1804), American revolutionary
Hezekiah G. Spruill (1808–1874), Confederate general
Wild Jimmy Spruill (1934–1996), American session guitarist
Joseph Spruill (b. c. 1690), American politician
Lionell Spruill (b. 1946), American politician
Marquis Spruill (b. 1991), American football player
Samuel Spruill (d. 1760), American politician
Shannon Spruill (b. 1975), American professional wrestler known as Daffney
Zeke Spruill (b. 1989), American baseball player